Bouverie may refer to:

Place
 Bouverie, Port Glasgow, Inverclyde, Scotland, United Kingdom
 Bouverie Goddard
 Bouverie Street

People

Bouverie (surname)

See also
 des Bouverie
 Pleydell-Bouverie
 Bouwerie
 Bouveret syndrome (disambiguation)